Stepanida Artakhinova (born 13 September 1989) is a Russian Paralympic archer. She competed in the 2012 Summer Paralympics, winning a bronze medal. She competed at the 2020 Summer Paralympics, in Team compound open, winning a bronze medal with her teammate, Bair Shigaev.

She competed at the 2015 World Archery Para Championships, winning a bronze medal.

References 

Paralympic archers of Russia
Archers at the 2020 Summer Paralympics
Paralympic bronze medalists for the Russian Paralympic Committee athletes
Living people
Medalists at the 2020 Summer Paralympics
Paralympic medalists in archery
People from Olyokminsky District
1989 births
Sportspeople from Sakha
21st-century Russian people